The Zimbabwean Chess Championship is the national chess championship of Zimbabwe.

Winners

References

Chess national championships
Chess in Zimbabwe
Sports competitions in Zimbabwe